Coke Studio Bel 3arabi (Coke Studio بالعربي) is a music television programme in the Middle East and North Africa featuring performances by various Arabic and international music artists. It is inspired by the Pakistani show of the same name.

It is a program that brings together established Arab and international artists to collaborate and record an original fusion song meshing two or more unique genres of music.

Season 1 (2012)

Scheduled episode line-up
 Episode 1
 Episode Airing Date: 11 April 2012
 Episode Theme: Oriental Music - Pop meets Flamenco music
 Artists Profile: Nancy Ajram, an Arab pop music icon meets José Gálvez who comes from a pure Gypsy Spanish tradition.
 Episode 2
 Episode Airing Date: 18 April 2012
 Episode Theme: Oriental Tarab music meets Yugoslavian Gypsy Music
 Artists Profile: Syrian artist, Rouwaida Attieh and Bilal who hails from the “Nawar” Gypsy clan in Lebanon are paired with The Yugoslavian Gypsy Brass Band from the Balkan.
 Episode 3
 Episode Airing Date: 25 April 2012
 Episode Theme: Oriental music meets Opera
 Artists Profile: Yara with her soulful and soft vocals meets Tino Favazza, a Sicilian tenor. They come together to create a fusion where the Oriental music meets Opera.
 Episode 4
 Episode Airing Date: 2 May 2012
 Episode Theme: Oriental music meets House music
 Artists Profile: Jannat from Morocco with her tender voice along with The Chehade Brothers (Farid and Rami Chehade) with their traditional music meet the avant-garde DJ Jerry Ropero. The three artists meet to create a fusion of Oriental and House music to “Niyal Albou”.
 Episode 5
 Episode Airing Date: 9 May 2012
 Episode Theme: Oriental Music meets Hip Hop music
 Artists Profile: Mohamed Hamaki a star of the Arabic music meets Jay Sean the international hip hop artist with more than 8 million copies sold for his first 2 singles. The come together to create a fusion rendition of “Mustafa ya Mustafa”.
 Episode 6
 Episode Airing Date: 16 May 2012
 Episode Theme: Oriental Music meets Reggae music
 Artists Profile: Mohamed Mounir, the King, the most renowned Egyptian artist meets The Wailers, who along with Bob Marley defined Reggae Music. They come together to create a fusion where Egyptian music meets Reggae music.
 Episode 7
 Episode Airing: 23 May 2012
 Episode Theme: Oriental Music meets R&B music
 Artists Profile: Saber Al Robai a star of the Arabic and a distinctive voice along Cairokee, the first rock band meet with Shontelle the gifted as both a writer and a singer, that carved a reputation in the Caribbean music world over the last several years. They all come together to create a fusion where the Oriental music meets R&B music.
 Episode 8
 Episode airing: 30 May 2012
 Episode Theme: Oriental music meets Tango
 Artists Profile: Wadih El Safi, the famous Lebanese cultural icon, also known as the “Voice of Lebanon”, meets Fabien Bertero, a young Argentinean musician, violinist, arranger, and composer. The artists combine their voices and talents to come up with a one-of-a-kind fusion song.
 Episode 9
 Episode airing: 6 June 2012
 Episode Theme: Best of Coke Studio Middle East

Season 2 (2013)

Hosts: Abdel Fattah Grini & Bruna Tameih

Sound Director: Hadi Sharara

Scheduled episode line-up
 Episode 1
 Episode Airing Date: 25 April 2013
 Artists Profile: Sherine Abdel Wahab from Egypt & Nelly from USA
 Fusion Song: Just A Dream
 Episode 2
 Episode Airing Date: 2 May 2013
 Artists Profile: Karol Saqr from Lebanon & Mika from UK
 Fusion Song: Relax, Take It Easy
 Episode 3
 Episode Airing Date: 9 May 2013
 Artists Profile: Cairokee from Egypt & Ayo from Nigeria - Germany
 Fusion Song: Fire/Ethbat Makanak
 Episode 4
 Episode Airing Date: 16 May 2013
 Artists Profile: Kadim Al Sahir from Iraq & Dimitri from France
 Fusion Song: Fakihat Al Hob
 Episode 5
 Episode Airing Date: 23 May 2013
 Artists Profile: Shamma Hamdan from UAE & Jay Sean from UK
 Fusion Song: Down
 Episode 6
 Episode Airing Date: 30 May 2013
 Artists Profile: Myriam Fares from Lebanon & Flo Rida from USA
 Fusion Song: Wild Ones
 Episode 7
 Episode Airing: 6 June 2013
 Artists Profile: Waed from KSA & Yves Larock from Switzerland
 Fusion Song: Rise Up
 Episode 8
 Episode airing: 13 June 2013
 Artists Profile: Naya from Lebanon & Edward Maya from Romania
 Fusion Song: Men Idi
 Episode 9
 Episode airing: 20 June 2013
 Artists Profile: Mohamed Hamaki from Egypt & Mustafa Sandal from Turkey
 Fusion Song: En Büyük Hikaye/We Eftakart
 Episode 10
 Episode airing: 28 June 2013
 Episode Theme: Best of Coke Studio Bel 3arabi - Season Two
 Promo Song: Abdel Fattah Grini - Oyouno El Kahla

Season 3 (2014)
 Episode 1
 Episode airing: 12 Sep 2014
 Artist Profile: Assala Nasri from Syria & Kool & the Gang from USA
 Fusion Song: She's Fresh
 Episode 2
 Episode airing: 19 Sep 2014
 Artist Profile: Shatha Hassoun from Iraq & Tom Novy from Germany
 Fusion Song: Al Ein Molayatin
 Episode 3
 Episode airing: 19 Sep 2014
 Artist Profile: JadaL from Jordan & Diana Yukawa from Japan
 Fusion Song: Jaddele
 Episode 4
 Episode airing: 10 Oct 2014
 Artist Profile: Maya Diab from Lebanon & Jason Derulo from USA
 Fusion Song: Talk To Me
 Episode 5
 Episode airing: 17 Oct 2014
 Artist Profile: Mashrou' Leila from Lebanon & Nile Rodgers from USA
 Fusion Song: Get Lucky
 Episode 6
 Episode airing: 24 Oct 2014
 Artist Profile: BLAK R from KSA & Sandy Mölling from Germany
 Fusion Song: Derailed
 Episode 7
 Episode airing: 31 Oct 2014
 Artist Profile: Balqees Ahmed Fathi from Yemen & David Penn from Spain
 Fusion Song: Ya Hezzaly

References

External links

Bel 3arabi
2012 television series debuts
2014 television series endings
Arabi